Ysaline Bonaventure and Bibiane Schoofs were the defending champions, but Bonaventure chose not to participate. Schoofs played alongside Olga Doroshina, but lost in the first round to Audrey Albié and Margot Yerolymos.

Cornelia Lister and Renata Voráčová won the title, defeating Andreea Mitu and Elena-Gabriela Ruse in the final, 6–1, 6–2.

Seeds

Draw

Draw

References
Main Draw

Engie Open Andrézieux-Bouthéon 42 - Doubles